William Slight (19 September 1858 – 22 December 1941) was an Australian cricketer who played for Victoria and South Australia. He played his one first-class cricket match for Victoria in 1877.

See also
 List of Victoria first-class cricketers

References

External links
 

1858 births
1941 deaths
Australian cricketers
Victoria cricketers
South Australia cricketers
Cricketers from Melbourne
People from South Melbourne